Le Manoir du diable or The House of the Devil, released in the United States as The Haunted Castle and in Britain as The Devil's Castle, is an 1896 French short silent film directed by Georges Méliès. The film, which depicts a brief pantomimed sketch in the style of a theatrical comic fantasy, tells the story of an encounter with the Devil and various attendant phantoms. It is intended to evoke amusement and wonder from its audiences, rather than fear. However, because of its themes and characters, the film has been considered to technically be the first horror film. Such a classification can also be attributed to the film's depiction of a human transforming into a bat, a plot element which has led some observers to label the work the first vampire film. The film is also innovative in length; its running time of over three minutes was ambitious for its era.

A single remake was produced one year later under the title Le Château hanté (The Haunted Castle), which is often confused with this film.

The film was presumed lost until 1988, when a copy was found in the New Zealand Film Archive.

Plot
The film opens with a giant bat flying into a medieval castle. The bat circles the room, before suddenly changing into the Devil. Mephistopheles produces a cauldron and an assistant, who helps him conjure a woman from the cauldron.

The room clears shortly before two cavaliers enter. The Devil's assistant pokes their backs before instantaneously teleporting to different areas of the room, confusing the pair and causing one to flee. The second stays and has several other tricks played on him, such as furniture moving around and the sudden appearance of a skeleton. The cavalier is unfazed, using a sword to attack the skeleton, which then turns into a bat, then into Mephistopheles, who conjures four spectres to subdue the man. Recovering from the spectres' attack, the man is visibly dazed and is brought the woman from the cauldron, who impresses him with her beauty. Mephistopheles then turns her into a withered old crone in front of the man's eyes, then again into the four spectres.

The second cavalier returns and, after a brief show of bravery, flees again by leaping over the balcony's edge. After the spectres disappear, the cavalier is confronted face-to-face by the Devil before reaching for and brandishing a large crucifix, which causes the Devil to vanish.

Production
The Haunted Castle was filmed outside in the garden of Méliès's property in Montreuil, Seine-Saint-Denis, with painted scenery.

In Méliès's era, film actors performed anonymously and no credits were provided. However, it is known that Jehanne d'Alcy, a successful stage actress who appeared in many of Méliès's films and later became his second wife, plays the woman who comes out of the cauldron. The film historian Georges Sadoul hypothesized that the Devil in the film was played by Jules-Eugène Legris, a magician who performed at Méliès's Théâtre Robert-Houdin in Paris and who later made an appearance in Méliès's famous 1902 film A Trip to the Moon.

The film was released by Méliès's studio, commonly known as the Star Film Company, and numbered 78–80 in its catalogues at the Theater Robert-Houdin (8 Boulevard Des Italiens, Paris). It remains unknown whether the film was either released at the end of the year 1896 or at the beginning of 1897, but it should not be confused with Le Château hanté, made by Méliès later in 1897 and also released as The Haunted Castle.

Reception
In the book Universal Monsters: Origins, Christopher Ripley writes, "If Méliès was shooting for terror, he fell short of the mark. Initially the film was amusing to its audience, rather than terror-inducing... What was also notable about the film was Méliès' use of cinematography to morph characters into other characters. Though technology did not exist to create such visuals, Méliès used limited tools and his imagination to create a relatively impressive production."

Loss 
The only known copy was bought at a junk shop in the 1930s-40s in Christchurch, New Zealand but not recognized until 1985.

See also 

 1896 in film
 List of ghost films

References

External links
 
 

1896 films
1896 horror films
1890s ghost films
French silent short films
French black-and-white films
Films directed by Georges Méliès
Films set in castles
The Devil in film
French vampire films
1890s rediscovered films
Articles containing video clips
Rediscovered French films
1896 short films
1890s French films
Films shot in Île-de-France
Films about witchcraft
Silent horror films